Yoon Chan-young (born April 25, 2001) is a South Korean actor. He began his career as a child actor and gained wider recognition for his appearance and fame in the 2022 Netflix series, All of Us Are Dead.

Filmography

Film

Television series

Web series

Awards and nominations

References

External links
 

2001 births
Living people
South Korean male child actors
South Korean male film actors
South Korean male television actors
South Korean male web series actors
Hanyang University alumni